Joshua Maxwell Coley (born 24 July 1998) is an English footballer who plays as a winger for  club Exeter City.

Career
Coley was born in Stevenage but grew up in York. He was in the youth team at York City before returning south. Coley began his senior career in the Spartan South Midlands Football League with Arlesey Town Reserves, before moving on to Letchworth Garden City Eagles in the Herts Senior County League.

In 2016 he joined Southern Football League side Hitchin Town. Coley only made a handful of appearances for the Canaries, and spent most of his time out on loan with Histon, Arlesey Town, Langford and Baldock Town, where he scored 21 goals in all competitions in the 2017–18 season, combining non-league football with working as a bricklayer.

After impressing in a trial, he signed a one-year deal with Norwich City in July 2018, and featured regularly for their under-23 side, scoring once in twenty appearances. Coley's contract was extended for another year in February 2019.

In June 2019, he joined Scottish Championship club Dunfermline Athletic on a year-long loan deal, with his first appearance coming in a Scottish League Cup match with St Mirren where he played the full 90 minutes of his side's 3–2 victory. Coley briefly returned to Norwich in January 2020, before having his contract cancelled by mutual consent in February. Shortly after, he signed for Spartan South Midlands Football League side Stotfold.

In July 2020, Coley signed for National League side Maidenhead United. On 12 October 2020, he scored his first goal for the club to give his side their first win of the season against Wrexham.

On 8 June 2021, it was announced that Coley had signed for Exeter City on a two-year deal for an undisclosed fee.

On 1 September 2022, he joined EFL League Two's Harrogate Town on loan until the end of the 2022–23 season. Coley was recalled in January 2023.

Career statistics

Honours
Exeter City
League Two runner-up: 2021–22

References

External links

Josh Coley at Aylesbury United

 

1998 births
Living people
People from Stevenage
English footballers
Association football midfielders
York City F.C. players
Arlesey Town F.C. players
Hitchin Town F.C. players
Histon F.C. players
Baldock Town F.C. players
Norwich City F.C. players
Dunfermline Athletic F.C. players
Stotfold F.C. players
Maidenhead United F.C. players
Exeter City F.C. players
Harrogate Town A.F.C. players
English Football League players
Scottish Professional Football League players
National League (English football) players
Southern Football League players